Clauzadella is a genus of fungi in the family Verrucariaceae. A monotypic genus, it contains the single species Clauzadella gordensis, discovered in France and described as new to science in 1996 by Pere Navarro-Rosinés and Claude Roux.

The genus name Clauzadella honours F.J. Georges Clauzade (1914–2002), a French teacher and botanist (Mycology and Lichenology).

References

Verrucariales
Lichen genera
Monotypic Eurotiomycetes genera
Taxa described in 1996
Taxa named by Claude Roux
Lichenicolous fungi